Colonel Charles deForest Chandler (December 24, 1878 – May 18, 1939) was an American military aviator, and the first head of the Aeronautical Division, U.S. Signal Corps that later became the United States Air Force.  He was one of earliest aviators to show that a machine gun could be fired from an airplane.

Biography
He was born in Cleveland, Ohio, on Christmas Eve, December 24, 1878. He was commissioned as a 1st lieutenant in the Signal Corps during the Spanish–American War. He was discharged in 1899 but was re-commissioned in 1901.

While in the rank of captain, he served as of the Aeronautical Division of the Signal Corps from August 1, 1907, to May 13, 1908, and also from June 20, 1911, to April 1, 1913.

With the United States entering World War I in April 1917, he quickly rose from captain to temporary colonel in a period of only seven months. He commanded the balloon section of the American Expeditionary Forces during World War I. He was awarded the Distinguished Service Medal for his services during the war.

Chandler reverted to his permanent rank of lieutenant colonel in April 1920 and retired from the army for disability in the line of duty in October of the same year. He was promoted to colonel on the retired list in June 1930.

He died on May 18, 1939, and was buried at Arlington National Cemetery.

Publications
 Balloon and airship gases (1926) with Walter Stuart Diehl

Awards
 Distinguished Service Medal
 Spanish War Service Medal
 Philippine Campaign Medal
 World War I Victory Medal

Dates of rank

References

External links
 Charles deForest Chandler at Early Aviators
 

1878 births
1939 deaths
American aviators
Aerial warfare pioneers
Burials at Arlington National Cemetery
United States Army colonels
United States Air Force officers
United States Army Air Service pilots of World War I